Croatia competed at the 2016 Winter Youth Olympics in Lillehammer, Norway from 12 to 21 February 2016.

Alpine skiing

Boys

Girls

Parallel mixed team

Biathlon

Croatia qualified one boy.

Boys

Bobsleigh

Croatia sent one athlete to compete in the monobob bobsled event.

Girls

Cross country skiing

Croatia qualified a team of one boy and one girl.

Boy

Girl

Cross

Sprint

Snowboarding

Slopestyle

See also
Croatia at the 2016 Summer Olympics

References

2016 in Croatian sport
Nations at the 2016 Winter Youth Olympics
Croatia at the Youth Olympics